The Basketball Federation of Serbia and Montenegro, previously Basketball Federation of Yugoslavia, was a non-profit organization and the national sports governing body for basketball in Serbia and Montenegro. Federal Republic of Yugoslavia renamed to Serbia and Montenegro in 2003. Until 2006, the organization has represented Serbia and Montenegro in FIBA and the men's and women's national basketball teams in the Olympic Committee of Serbia and Montenegro.

After the dissolution of Serbia and Montenegro in 2006, the successor countries all set up their national federations.

History
Following the breakup of Yugoslavia, Basketball Federation of Yugoslavia was disbanded and five new federations (of former Yugoslavia states) were established in 1991 and 1992. In 1992, the Basketball Federation of FR Yugoslavia was established and became the governing body in FR Yugoslavia.

From 1992 to 2003, the national team played under name of FR Yugoslavia and from 2003 to 2006 under name of Serbia and Montenegro in international competitions. Following the Montenegrin declaration of independence in 2006, the Basketball Federation of Montenegro was established and joined FIBA, while Basketball Federation of Serbia retained the place of Basketball Federation of Serbia and Montenegro as a FIBA member.

Also, the Basketball Federation of Kosovo, the governing body in disputed territory of Kosovo, joined FIBA on 13 March 2015 following the adoption of Brussels Agreement.

Competitions 
Men's
 Regional league: Adriatic League
 1st-tier league: First League
 2nd-tier league: First B League
 Cup tournament: Yugoslav Cup (1992–2002) & Radivoj Korać Cup (2002–2006)
 2nd-tier cup tournament: Serbian Cup

Women's
 Regional league: Adriatic League
 1st-tier league: First League
 Cup tournament: Serbia and Montenegro Women's Basketball Cup

National teams 
Men's
 Men's national team 
 Men's national under-21 team
 Men's national under-20 team
 Men's national under-19 team
 Men's national under-18 team
 Men's national under-16 team
 Men's university team

Women's
 Women's national team
 Women's national under-20 team
 Women's national under-19 team
 Women's national under-18 team
 Women's national under-16 team
 Women's university team

New national federations
In 2006, Montenegro became an independent nation and Serbia became the legal successor of Serbia and Montenegro. In 2008, Kosovo declared independence from Serbia and became a FIBA member in 2015.

List of presidents

FR Yugoslavia
 Veselin Barović (1991–1995)
 Nebojša Čović (1995–1997)
 Dragoslav Ražnatović (1997–1999)
 Želimir Cerović (1999–2003)
Serbia and Montenegro
 Miodrag Babić (2003–2005)
 Goran Knežević (2005–2006)

See also 
 Basketball Federation of Yugoslavia

Notes and references

Notes

References

Serbia
Basketball in Serbia and Montenegro
Basketball
2006 disestablishments in Serbia and Montenegro
Organizations disestablished in 2006